CCDS is an abbreviation that may refer to:

 Canton Country Day School, a private, secular PK-8 school located in Plain Township, Stark County, Ohio.
 Charlotte Country Day School, a private, secular K-12 school located in Charlotte, North Carolina.
 Cincinnati Country Day School, a non-parochial, private school in Indian Hill, Ohio.
 The Committees of Correspondence for Democracy and Socialism, an American democratic socialist organization.
 Consensus CDS Project, a global bioinformatics project involving the NCBI, EBI, WTSI and UCSC.
 Cerebral creatine deficiency syndromes
 Credit Contingent Interest Rate Swaps, a structured credit derivative, commonly referred to as CCDS by industry professionals, even though the initials do not match.
 Common Clinical Data Set, a set of data used in definitions and rules for health information technology in the United States

See also
CCD (disambiguation)